The seventh series of the Australian cooking game show MasterChef Australia premiered on 5 May 2015 on Network Ten.

This series was won by Billie McKay in the grand finale against Georgia Barnes on 27 July 2015. The announcement of the winner was watched by 2.2 million metro viewers, making it one of the most watched shows of 2015.

Changes
Shannon Bennett took on the role of guest mentor, guiding contestants participating in Immunity Challenges, the role Kylie Kwong held in series 6. Unlike the sixth series, the advantage for the Immunity Challenge was now handed to the contestant's choice instead of the chef. The use of the power apron was now reduced to one day in a week only and it passed down to the next contestant who excelled in the subsequent challenge.

Contestants

Top 24
The Top 24 were revealed on 5–6 May 2015. Prior to the first competition round, Mario Montecuollo was disqualified after his five-month professional kitchen experience violated the show's guidelines of the auditions. The producers investigated the contestant's position as a head chef at his bar in Enmore and discovered that Montecuollo had been working one day a week as a paid cook for five months within the past years. Casual participants were allowed to audition without working previously in a professional kitchen for more than six weeks, ruling him ineligible to compete in the show. He was replaced by Jessie Spiby, who had originally missed out on the Top 24 in the second episode.

Future appearances

 In Series 8 Billie McKay appeared as a guest judge for both a Mystery Box and an Invention Test challenge, while Reynold Poernomo appeared as a guest judge for a Pressure Test.
 In Series 9 Reynold appeared as a guest chef for an Immunity Challenge, where he won against contestant Callan Smith.
 In Series 10 Reynold appeared as a guest chef for an Immunity Challenge, although contestant Khanh Ong opted to cook against Series 8 runner-up Matt Sinclair instead.
 In Series 11 Billie was brought onboard one of three mentors for the Immunity Challenges.
 Reynold appeared on Series 12 along with Rose Adam. Rose was eliminated on May 5, 2020, finishing 19th and Reynold was eliminated on July 19, 2020, finishing 3rd.
 Reynold appeared on Series 13 as a guest judge for an elimination challenge.
 Reynold appeared on MasterChef Indonesia (season 5) as a guest judge as well as the brother of judge Arnold Poernomo.
 John Carasig appeared on Series 14  along with Billie, who competed for a chance to win the title for the 2nd time. John was eliminated on May 8, 2022, finishing 21st. Billie won the competition on 12 July, 2022, making her the first contestant ever to win the show twice.
 In Series 14, Reynold appeared as a guest judge for a Pressure Test.

Guest chefs

Elimination chart

Episodes and ratings
 Colour key:
  – Highest rating during the series
  – Lowest rating during the series

References

External links
Official website

MasterChef Australia
2015 Australian television seasons